Justice Witherell may refer to:

Benjamin F. H. Witherell, associate justice of the Michigan Supreme Court
James Witherell, associate justice of the Supreme Court for the Territory of Michigan